Sulata Chowdhury (1945 – 16 September 1997) was a Bengali actress and theatre personality.

Chowdhury made her film debut with Debarshi Narader Sansar (1960). As a leading actress her first film was Sudhir Mukherjee's Shesh Paryanta (1960) which was a prominent success at the box office.

Early life
Choudhury was born as Maya Roychowdhury in 1945 in Kolkata, British India. Her father's name was Atal Chandra Roychowdhury. She had passion in dancing and singing since childhood. Chowdhury learnt dance from Ramnarayan Mishra.

Career
Chowdhury made her film debut with Deborsee Narader Sansar (1960). Chowdhury also acted as heroine in Sesh Paryanta directed by Sudhir Mukherjee. After that she starred in number of films in supporting roles. Satyajit Ray offered her a role in Mahanagar but she could not accept it due to contract problems. She acted in many Bengali films and Utpal Dutt's Little Theatre Group.

Partial filmography

 Shesh Paryanta (1960)
 Dui Bhai (1961) - Madhuri
 Abasheshe (1962)
 Kanna (1962)
 Dada Thakur
 Tridhara (1963) - Keya Saha
 NATUN TIRTHA (1964)
 Mukhujey Paribar (1965)
 Teen Bhubaner Pare (1969) - Bireshwar's wife
 Rupasi (1970) - Balaram's Second SIL
 Pratibad (1971)
 Janani (1971)
 Jiban Jigyasa (1971)
 Stree (1972)
 Anindita (1972) - Bharati's Cousin's wife
 Roudra Chhaya (1973)
 Sonar Khancha (1973)
 Kaya Hiner Kahini (1973) - Kanchi
 Mouchak (1974)
 Alor Thikana (1974)
 Fuleswari (1974)
 Sansar Seemantey (1975)
 Swayamsiddha (1975)
 Bagh Bondi Khela (1975)
 Sanyasi Raja (1975) - Bilasi Dasi
 Agnishwar (1975) - Padma
 Sei Chokh (1975)
 Dampati (1976)
 Sudur Niharika (1976)
 Bhola Moira (1977)
 Kabita (1977)
 Golap Bou (1977)
 Sabyasachi (1977) - Ma Shuye
 Dadar Kirti (1980) - Phoolmati
 Bhagya Chakra (1980)
 Subarna Golak (1981)
 Mukhujjey Paribar (1986)
 Debika (1987) - (final film role)

References

External links
 

Indian film actresses
1945 births
1997 deaths
Actresses in Bengali cinema
Actresses from Kolkata
20th-century Indian actresses